Romola Sadie Garai (born 6 August 1982) is a British actress and film director. Known for her extensive work on stage and screen she often acts in period films. Her early film roles include Nicholas Nickleby (2002), I Capture the Castle (2003), Inside I'm Dancing (2004), and Dirty Dancing: Havana Nights (2004). She's gained prominence for her performances in the critically acclaimed costume dramas such as Vanity Fair (2004), As You Like It (2006), Amazing Grace (2007), Atonement (2007), Glorious 39 (2009), and Suffragette (2015).

She's also known for her portrayal of Emma Woodhouse in the BBC series Emma (2009) for which she received a nomination for the Golden Globe Award for Best Actress – Miniseries or Television Film. She received a nomination for the British Academy Television Award for Best Actress for the BBC Two series The Crimson Petal and the White (2011). From 2011 to 2012 she played Bel Rowley in the BBC series The Hour receiving Golden Globe Award and Critics' Choice Television Award nominations. In 2022, she portrayed Mary Tudor in Becoming Elizabeth.

Early life
Garai was born in Hong Kong, to British parents. Her father's family is Jewish. Her mother, Janet A. (née Brown), brought up Romola and her three siblings. Her father, Adrian Earl Rutherford Garai (born 1945), is a bank manager. Garai's great-grandfather, Bernhard "Bert" Garai, an immigrant from Hungary, founded the Keystone Press Agency, a photographic agency and archive, in London, in the early 20th century.

Garai is the third of four siblings. Her family moved to Singapore when she was five, and returned to Wiltshire in England when she was eight. She attended an independent boarding school, Stonar School in Wiltshire and, at 16, moved to London to attend the City of London School for Girls, where she completed her A-levels. She appeared in school plays, and was with the National Youth Theatre until the age of 18, when she signed to play the younger version of Dame Judi Dench's character in the BBC Films/HBO co-production for television, The Last of the Blonde Bombshells.

After her A-levels, she studied English literature at Queen Mary University of London before transferring and graduating with a first-class degree from the Open University. She originally intended only to focus on her studies but later began acting full-time during the summer holiday.

Acting career

2000–2009
Garai's first professional acting role was in the 2000 BBC-HBO TV film The Last of the Blonde Bombshells, where she played Judi Dench's character as a young woman. She then appeared in the BBC television series Attachments (2000–2002).

Garai's first major film role was in Nicholas Nickleby. She played Kate Nickleby, a supporting role, in the well-reviewed film. The cast were awarded Best Ensemble by the National Board of Review. In 2003's I Capture the Castle, she played 17-year-old Cassandra Mortmain. Her performance earned her a nomination for a Most Promising Newcomer award from the British Independent Film Awards.

Her performance in Dirty Dancing: Havana Nights (2004) received mixed reviews. Later in 2004 Vanity Fair was released, in which she played Amelia Sedley. Co-starring :Reese Witherspoon, :Jim Broadbent and :James Purefoy, the film was based on the 19th century novel by :William Makepeace Thackeray and it was directed by :Mira Nair. The film received mixed reviews.

In 2005, Garai received another BIFA nomination, this time for Best Supporting Actress, for her performance as Siobhan in the independent film Inside I'm Dancing. Her portrayal earned her the British Supporting Actress of the Year award from the London Film Critics Circle. Also in 2005, she starred in a two-part drama made for television, entitled The Incredible Journey of Mary Bryant. While critics hailed it as "pleasingly old-fashioned adventure," it was her performance that won the most admiration and earned her two nominations: Best Lead Actress in Television from the Australian Film Institute and Most Outstanding Actress in a Drama Series from the Logie Awards. The Observer noted: "As for the tireless Garai, she once again demonstrated an instinctive understanding of the vital difference between overperforming and overacting."

She appears in Kenneth Branagh's film adaptation of As You Like It (2006), as Celia. The film was released in some European cinemas before being broadcast in 2007 on HBO cable television in the U.S. In 2009, it opened in cinemas in Mexico.

Also in 2006, she starred in the biographical drama film Amazing Grace, which was directed by Michael Apted and co-starring Ioan Gruffudd, Benedict Cumberbatch and Michael Gambon. The film was about William Wilberforce, a leader of the movement to abolish the slave trade. Garai played Barbara Spooner, the wife of Wilberforce. The film received generally positive reviews.

In 2007, Garai starred as Angel Deverell in François Ozon's Angel. The Independent named her one of the actresses of the year for her performance in the film. Garai was also nominated for the Prix Lumiere award (the French equivalent of the Golden Globes), as Best Female Newcomer for Angel, making her the first British actress to be nominated for the award.

Also in 2007, she starred in the Oscar-nominated film Atonement as the 18-year-old Briony Tallis. Co-starring :Keira Knightley, :James McAvoy, :Vanessa Redgrave and :Brenda Blethyn, the film went on to receive seven Academy Award nominations, including Best Picture. Garai earned a Best Actress nomination from the Evening Standard British Film Awards for her performance. She also appeared in two Royal Shakespeare Company productions: as Cordelia in King Lear and as Nina in The Seagull, starring alongside Ian McKellen, Frances Barber, Sylvester McCoy, Jonathan Hyde and William Gaunt. The run, which toured the world, went into residence in the New London Theatre where it ended mid-January 2008. She received rave reviews, especially as Nina in The Seagull: The Independent called her a "woman on the edge of stardom", while This is London called her "superlative", and said that the play was "distinguished by the illuminating, psychological insights of Miss Garai's performance". She reprised her role as Cordelia in a televised version of King Lear.

In 2008, she appeared in the feature film The Other Man alongside Liam Neeson, Laura Linney and Antonio Banderas. Garai next starred in Stephen Poliakoff's World War II thriller Glorious 39, alongside Julie Christie, Jenny Agutter, Bill Nighy, Christopher Lee and Eddie Redmayne. The film had its world premiere at the Toronto International Film Festival.

In 2009, she played the title role in a television adaptation of Jane Austen's Emma, a four-hour miniseries that premiered on BBC One in October 2009, co-starring Jonny Lee Miller and Sir Michael Gambon. Garai was nominated for a Golden Globe for her performance. Emma then appeared on American television as part of PBS' Masterpiece Classic anthology series, airing in most U.S. markets over three consecutive Sunday evenings during January and February 2010.

In 2009, The Sunday Times Magazine named her as one of Britain's rising stars alongside Matthew Goode, Andrea Riseborough, Hugh Dancy, Eddie Redmayne and others. In January of that year she travelled to the Syrian-Iraqi border to make a short film titled No Man's Land for the UNHCR, highlighting the plight of 800 Palestinian refugees living in the Al-Tanaf refugee camp. Of her visit to the refugee camps Garai states, "My trip to a refugee camp in Syria destroyed any hope that the horrors of Iraq might end, or that we are doing enough to help its victims." Garai has been hailed by her Glorious 39 director Stephen Poliakoff as "the next Kate Winslet" and someone who will "dominate British cinema" in the future.

2010–present

In 2011, Garai starred in the four-part BBC drama The Crimson Petal and the White based on the novel by Michel Faber. She was nominated for Best Actress at the 2012 BAFTA awards for the role. In 2011 she played Bel Rowley in the TV drama The Hour leading with Dominic West and Ben Whishaw for which she was Golden Globe nominated. Later that year she played the lead role of Becky in the stage play The Village Bike at the Royal Court for which she was critically lauded.

Garai starred alongside actress Anne Hathaway and Jim Sturgess in Lone Scherfig's One Day. She also played the part of a drug addicted single mother in the independent British film Junkhearts with Eddie Marsan and Tom Sturridge. She reprised her role as Bel Rowley in the second season of The Hour, which ran from 14 November to 13 December 2012. In 2013 she appeared in the sci-fi film The Last Days on Mars.
In 2015 she played Isabella in Measure for Measure at the Young Vic, with her performance described as 'astonishing', 'wonderfully impassioned' and 'thrilling'. That same year she had a supporting role in Suffragette written by The Hour scribe Abi Morgan, and a leading role in the 90-minute drama Churchill's Secret opposite Michael Gambon and Lindsay Duncan for ITV.

Garai's recent Radio Drama work for BBC Radio 4 includes The Stone Tape adapted by Peter Strickland, and the lead in three of the conspiracy thriller series Tracks by Matthew Broughton. In 2017, she appeared in the Channel 4 miniseries Born to Kill as Jenny, the mother of a seemingly ordinary 16-year-old schoolboy who appears to have psychopathic tendencies. From June to September 2017 she appeared as Sarah Churchill in the London premiere of Helen Edmundson's Queen Anne. Garai appeared as Marin Brandt in BBC One's adaptation of the period thriller novel The Miniaturist. Garai starred in Ella Hickson's play The Writer at the Almeida Theatre in London from 14 April to 26 May 2018.

Other work
Garai has written for The Guardian.

In 2012 she wrote and directed the short film Scrubber, casting Amanda Hale, Michelle Duncan, Honor Kneafsey and Steven Robertson. The film was shown at the Edinburgh film festival where it was nominated for Best British Short Film, at Sundance film festival where it was nominated for Best International Short Film, at London Short Film Festival where it won the Underwire Award for Best Female Character, and at Cannes where it screened in the Short Film Corner. The film was released as part of a short film collection, The Joy of Six, a Soda Pictures Release.

It was announced on 18 April 2018 that Garai will make her feature directorial debut with Amulet (previously named Outside), a horror film written by Garai and starring Carla Juri, Imelda Staunton and Alec Secareanu. The film went into production in autumn 2018. It was released on VOD in July 2020.

Personal life
Garai's great-grandfather emigrated from Budapest to New York in the 1910s with his English-born wife, then moved to London, where he founded the Keystone Press Agency. Most of Romola's Jewish relatives were murdered during the Holocaust in Hungary.

Garai lives in London. In  2009 she obtained a degree in English literature from the Open University. She guards her private life, saying, "It's too simplistic to say that people start to believe what's written about them. But what happens is that you become a certain way to please people, to be liked, to be what's expected of you, to change yourself so that you become the best possible version of yourself for people who don't know you. And I think that's a terrible, pernicious thing." She adds, "In a way, I'd rather go into an interview and be disliked, and have unpleasant things written about me, than to have a wonderful, glowing article written that is in no way a reflection of who I am."

Garai enjoys travelling and cooking, calling it "therapeutic". She has visited Hong Kong, Malaysia, Italy, Austria, Morocco, Switzerland and the United States, "To be the outsider for a period of time changes you for the better. It shakes up your comfort level. You have to really make an effort to enter into other people's culture and psychology and language, which the British are very bad at doing."

In March 2013, she gave birth to a daughter, and the following year married her boyfriend, British actor Sam Hoare. They have since had a second child.

Garai is a feminist and has criticised the film industry for its attitudes towards women.

Filmography

Film

Television

Theatre

Awards and nominations

References

External links
 

1982 births
Actresses from London
Alumni of the Open University
Alumni of Queen Mary University of London
English film actresses
English people of Jewish descent
English radio actresses
English stage actresses
National Youth Theatre members
English television actresses
English voice actresses
People educated at the City of London School for Girls
Hong Kong people
Living people
Royal Shakespeare Company members
English Shakespearean actresses
People educated at Stonar School
20th-century English actresses
21st-century English actresses
English people of Hungarian-Jewish descent
English feminists